Kirensky District is an administrative district, one of the thirty-three in Irkutsk Oblast, Russia. Municipally, it is incorporated as Kirensky Municipal District. It is located in the northeast of the oblast. Its administrative center is the town of Kirensk. As of the 2010 Census, the total population of the district was 20,322, with the population of Kirensk accounting for 62.2% of that number.

Geography
Kirensky district is located in the northeastern area of Irkutsk Oblast. It borders to the north with the Sakha Republic (Yakutia) and to the southeast with the Republic of Buryatia.

The Lena flows across the district. Its main tributaries in the region are the Kirenga, Chechuy, Chaya, Pilyuda and Ichera.

History
The district was established in 1929.

Administrative and municipal status
Within the framework of administrative divisions, Kirensky District is one of the thirty-three in the oblast. The town of Kirensk serves as its administrative center.

As a municipal division, the district is incorporated as Kirensky Municipal District.

References

Notes

Sources

Registry of the Administrative-Territorial Formations of Irkutsk Oblast 

Districts of Irkutsk Oblast
States and territories established in 1929